Eddie Glass (born December 19, 1970) is an American rock musician best known for his work with punk band Olivelawn and stoner rock bands Nebula and Fu Manchu. Nebula has been Glass' primary musical group since 1997, when he and drummer Ruben Romano acrimoniously split from Fu Manchu.

Biography 
Though currently known as a guitarist, Glass first gained recognition as the drummer in California punk band Olivelawn. Glass is the founder, lead guitarist, vocalist, and primary songwriter for Nebula, and previously acted in a similar capacity (minus the vocal duties) in Fu Manchu. Some of his songs have been featured in films, skateboard videos, and video games such as Tony Hawk's Pro Skater 4 and Tony Hawk's Underground 2.

Glass started playing with Hagop Najarian and Neil Blender in the mid 1980s as teenagers in southern California, and the trio formed Worked World. Worked World self-released one 7-inch EP. Some of these songs were featured in early skateboarding videos.

Discography

Nebula 
1998 – Let It Burn – (Relapse)
1999 – Sun Creature – (Man's Ruin)
1999 – Nebula/Lowrider – (Meteor City)
1999 – To the Center – (Sub Pop)
2001 – Charged – (Sub Pop)
2003 – Atomic Ritual – (Liquor & Poker)
2006 – Apollo – (Liquor & Poker)
2008 – Peel Sessions – (Sweet Nothing)
2009 – Heavy Psych – (Tee Pee)
2019 – Demos & Outtakes '98–'02 (Heavy Psych Sounds)
2019 – Holy Shit – (Heavy Psych Sounds)
2022 – Transmission From Mothership Earth – (Heavy Psych Sounds)

Fu Manchu 
1994 – No One Rides for Free – (Bong Load)
1995 – Daredevil – (Bong Load)
1996 – In Search Of... – (Mammoth Records)

Olivelawn 
1991 – Sap – (Nemesis Records)
1992 – Sopho-More Jinx! – (Headhunter Records)

References 

1970 births
American male singer-songwriters
American rock drummers
American rock guitarists
American male guitarists
American rock singers
American rock songwriters
Lead guitarists
Living people
Guitarists from California
Musicians from Oakland, California
20th-century American drummers
American male drummers
Fu Manchu (band) members
21st-century American singers
21st-century American guitarists
21st-century American drummers
20th-century American male musicians
21st-century American male singers
Singer-songwriters from California